A wall chaser is a specialised power tool used for cutting narrow grooves in walls. Is often applied to lay electrical cable in the walls. The tool is usually powered by an electric motor which drives a pair of abrasive discs like those found in an angle grinder, positioned closely together.

See also 
 Plunge saw

Grinding machines
Hand-held power tools